Saral-e Sofla (also Romanized as Sārāl-e Soflá; also known as Sārāl-e Pā’īn) is a village in Almahdi Rural District, Mohammadyar District, Naqadeh County, West Azerbaijan Province, Iran. At the 2006 census, its population was 118, in 20 families.

References 

Populated places in Naqadeh County